Traveler's Rest in Lincoln County, Kentucky is the historic home place of Isaac Shelby, the first Governor of Kentucky. Shelby acquired the property as the first land settlement preemption deed in Kentucky as a reward for his surveying services. The original house was built in 1786 of limestone, three feet thick. It stood until a fire in 1905. On the same site, a brick two-story house was built by Shelby's descendants. Built in 1906 in the Georgian and Federal revival styles, it was accepted into the U.S. National Register of Historic Places in 1976 for its association with Shelby. Shelby's original brick slave's quarters still stand on the property. The Isaac Shelby Cemetery State Historic Site on the same property, where Shelby and his family are buried, is open to the public. The house at Traveler's Rest is privately owned and is not open to the public.

See also
National Register of Historic Places listings in Kentucky

References

Houses completed in 1906
Houses in Lincoln County, Kentucky
National Register of Historic Places in Lincoln County, Kentucky
Slave cabins and quarters in the United States
1906 establishments in Kentucky
Georgian architecture in Kentucky